The 2012 NFL draft was the 77th annual meeting of National Football League (NFL) franchises to select newly eligible American football players for their rosters. The draft, which is officially called the "NFL Player Selection Meeting", was held at Radio City Music Hall in New York City from April 26 to April 28, 2012. There were 253 draft selections: 221 regular selections and 32 compensatory selections. A record 26 prospects attended the draft in person.

A main story around the draft was around quarterback prospect Andrew Luck. On April 17, Indianapolis general manager Ryan Grigson announced that the team would take Luck as their first-overall pick after releasing their longtime starting quarterback Peyton Manning, saying it was "the right thing to do" in anticipation of the "media gauntlet" Luck would face in the days leading up to the draft. Luck was highly touted as one of the best quarterback prospects in years and widely regarded as the top overall prospect in the draft. As a result, he had been the subject of the "Suck for Luck" campaigns by fans, who hoped that their teams would end up with the worst record in the 2011 season so they would have the chance to draft him. He was successful with the Colts, but dealt with several injuries throughout his career and decided to retire in 2019 while still in his prime, after winning the NFL Comeback Player of the Year Award. Another story of the draft was around Heisman-trophy winning quarterback Robert Griffin III. He was selected second-overall by the Washington Redskins, and had a breakout rookie season en route to winning that year's NFL Offensive Rookie of the Year Award. However, Griffin suffered an injury during the postseason that same year and has struggled to show the same level of play since; Griffin would later be released by the Redskins after the 2015 season.

The draft was highly regarded for its quarterback talent, with six out of the eleven quarterbacks selected (Luck, Griffin III, Ryan Tannehill, Russell Wilson, Nick Foles, and Kirk Cousins) selected to at least one Pro Bowl. Tannehill and Foles both had a season in which they led the NFL in passer rating; Foles was also named MVP of Super Bowl LII. As of 2022, Cousins is ranked in the top ten in career passer rating and completion percentage. Wilson was the most successful quarterback of the draft, making nine Pro Bowls and leading the Seahawks to their first Super Bowl victory. The draft also had several notable quarterbacks who are now regarded as draft busts. There were two players drafted in 2012 at 28 years old. Brandon Weeden became the oldest first-round selection in NFL history at 28 years old when he was selected by the Cleveland Browns, but left the team after two seasons. Jeris Pendleton became the oldest seventh-round selection in NFL history at 28 years old when he was selected by the Jacksonville Jaguars, but he left the team after one season. Brock Osweiler and Ryan Lindley also had largely unsuccessful careers in the NFL. A rare occurrence happened when the first and final picks in the draft were both quarterbacks and were taken by the same team; Chandler Harnish was chosen with the final pick of the draft by the Colts, causing him to be dubbed Mr. Irrelevant for 2012. Besides its quarterbacks, the draft overall is considered one of the best of all-time with numerous prospects showing Hall of Fame talent throughout their careers, including Defensive Player of the Year winners Luke Kuechly and Stephon Gilmore, along with perennial Pro Bowlers Lavonte David, Bobby Wagner, Fletcher Cox, T. Y. Hilton, Chandler Jones, Johnny Hekker, and Justin Tucker.

Early entrants

A record 65 non-seniors announced their intention to forgo their remaining NCAA eligibility and declare themselves eligible to be selected. Of the 65, 44 (or 67.7%) were drafted.

The selection of Luck, a junior, marked the fourth straight draft where the first overall selection was not a senior. Prior to the 2012 draft, six out of the previous seven first-overall draft selections had been players who had entered the draft early. Eight of the first ten players chosen in this draft were non-seniors, which matched the record set in the previous draft. Mark Barron and Ryan Tannehill were the only two seniors among the first ten draftees.

Player selections 
The following is the breakdown of the 253 players selected by position:

Draft selections

The draft was held between April 26 through April 28, 2012.

Supplemental draft
A supplemental draft was held on July 12, 2012. For each player selected in this draft, the team forfeits its pick in that round in the draft of the following season. Eight players were available, but only one was selected.

Notable undrafted players

Some notable undrafted players:

|}

Trades
In the explanations below, (D) denotes trades that took place during the draft, while (PD) indicates trades completed pre-draft.

Round one

Round two

Round three

Round four

Round five

Round six

Round seven

Forfeited picks
Three picks in the 2012 draft were forfeited:

Selections by conference
Selection totals by college conference (including supplemental draft)

References

Notes

Trade references

External links
 2012 NFL draft website
2012 NFL draft at Pro Football Reference
2012 NFL draft at ESPN

National Football League Draft
Nfl Draft, 2012
Draft
Radio City Music Hall
NFL Draft
NFL Draft
American football in New York City
2010s in Manhattan
Sporting events in New York City
Sports in Manhattan